Ammeldingen is the name of two different municipalities in the district of Bitburg-Prüm, in Rhineland-Palatinate, western Germany:
Ammeldingen an der Our
Ammeldingen bei Neuerburg